The 2021 SEC Championship Game was a college football game that was played on December 4, 2021, at Mercedes-Benz Stadium in Atlanta, Georgia. It was the 30th edition of the SEC Championship Game and determined the champion of the Southeastern Conference (SEC) for the 2021 season. The game began at 4:00 p.m. EST and was aired on CBS. The contest featured the Georgia Bulldogs, the East Division champions, and the Alabama Crimson Tide, the West Division champions.

Teams

The 2021 SEC Championship Game featured the Georgia Bulldogs, champions of the East Division, and the Alabama Crimson Tide, champions of the West Division. It was the teams' 71st meeting, with Alabama leading the series 41–25–4; they first met in 1895 and played frequently from 1901 to the mid-1970s. Alabama has won the last six meetings between the teams, with Georgia's last victory over the Tide coming in 2007. This was the third time Georgia and Alabama have played for an SEC Championship; the Crimson Tide won each of the previous two meetings, in 2012 and 2018. Alabama entered the game holding a 3–0 postseason advantage over Georgia, having won the 2018 College Football Playoff National Championship in addition to the two aforementioned SEC Championship Games.

This was the ninth SEC title game appearance for Georgia; they first appeared in 2002 and were 3–5 overall in previous appearances, though the Bulldogs have won 13 SEC championships in total, dating back to 1942. Alabama made their 14th SEC championship game appearance, dating back to the inaugural game in 1992; the Crimson Tide entered the game 9–4 in SEC title games in that stretch. Including titles earned before the championship game format, Alabama leads the conference with 28 in total, dating back to 1933. Georgia and Alabama have appeared frequently in recent SEC Championship Games; entering the game, nine of the last ten title games featured at least one of the two teams, with Georgia's last appearance being in 2019, and Alabama returning consecutively after winning the previous year.

Georgia

Led by sixth-year head coach Kirby Smart, the fifth-ranked Bulldogs began their season with a matchup against No. 3 Clemson in the Duke's Mayo Classic. The game, which hosted College GameDay earlier that morning, played out to a low-scoring 10–3 Georgia win, putting them in the No. 2 spot in the rankings just one week into the season. The Bulldogs put on a dominant performance in their home opener the next week, as they scored eight touchdowns and allowed just one in a victory over UAB, and soundly defeated South Carolina the following week to open SEC play. Back-to-back shutouts followed, as the Bulldogs kept both Vanderbilt and No. 8 Arkansas off the scoreboard, while scoring 62 and 37 points of their own, respectively. Georgia continued their form with two more wins against ranked opponents, as they defeated No. 18 Auburn on the road and No. 11 Kentucky at home; the former game saw Georgia play as the No. 1 team in the nation for the first time this season following Texas A&M's upset of then-No. 1 Alabama, and the latter game was the first in which Georgia allowed more than one touchdown. The Bulldogs returned to neutral site play when they faced Florida following a bye week; they defeated the Gators 34–7, with their three touchdowns in just over three minutes at the end of the game's second quarter contributing to the win. This was also the week that Georgia clinched the SEC East's berth in the championship game, as a result of Kentucky's loss to Mississippi State. The Bulldogs finished their conference season in much the same style as the games before; they defeated Missouri 43–6, and allowed a season-high 17 points to Tennessee, though still managed to win by three possessions. Georgia finished the regular season with a pair of non-conference games, as they routed the Charleston Southern Buccaneers by seven scores and their rivals Georgia Tech by the same number, concluding Georgia's first undefeated regular season since 1982.

Alabama

Like Georgia, 15th-year head coach Nick Saban and the top-ranked Crimson Tide opened their season with a neutral site kickoff game, as they faced No. 14 Miami (FL) in the Chick-fil-A Kickoff Game. The game ended with an Alabama victory, as the Tide won convincingly to earn a 1–0 start to their national title defense. They opened their home season with a win against FCS Mercer, and followed it with their first SEC contest at No. 11 Florida, which saw Alabama escape an upset bid with a two-point win against the Gators. Alabama would rout Southern Miss the following week, in a game that featured Jameson Williams record three touchdowns of 80 yards or more, before defeating No. 12 Ole Miss by three touchdowns at home to extend their streak to six consecutive wins in that rivalry series. The Tide suffered their first and only regular season setback the following week, when they were upset by Texas A&M in College Station thanks to Seth Small's 28-yard field goal as time expired, which gave the Aggies a three-point victory. This loss snapped a 19-game winning streak for the Tide and dropped Alabama to No. 5 in the AP Poll, though they were able to rebound with impressive wins over Mississippi State and Tennessee to put their record at 7–1 entering their bye week. To begin the month of November, the Crimson Tide hosted LSU, whom they defeated by six points; Alabama then defeated New Mexico State, their final non-conference opponent, by a score of 59–3. The Tide's final home game came against No. 21 Arkansas; Alabama won by only a touchdown despite quarterback Bryce Young's school-record 559 passing yards, and the Tide dropped to No. 3 in the College Football Playoff rankings. With the win, Alabama clinched the SEC West Division title and their spot in the SEC Championship Game. The Crimson Tide concluded their regular season a week later with an Iron Bowl matchup against Auburn; the game went to four overtimes before Alabama came away with a two-point victory; this was the first game in Iron Bowl history to reach overtime.

Game summary

Statistics
Team statistics
Individual statistics

See also
2022 College Football Playoff National Championship

References

External links
Game statistics at statbroadcast.com

Championship Game
SEC Championship Game
Alabama Crimson Tide football games
Georgia Bulldogs football games
SEC Championship Game
2021 in sports in Georgia (U.S. state)
2021 in Atlanta